Return of the Vampire is a compilation album of rare demo tracks by Mercyful Fate recorded before their first, official release in 1982. It was released in 1992 by Roadrunner Records RRD 9184.

The album cover was painted by Torbjorn Jorgensen / Studio Dzyan.

Track listing

All songs written by King Diamond (lyrics) and Hank Shermann (music) except where noted.

"Burning the Cross" – 8:49 (music by Benny Petersen)
"Curse of the Pharaohs" – 4:27
"Return of the Vampire" – 4:50
"On a Night of Full Moon" – 6:40
"A Corpse Without Soul" – 8:11
"Death Kiss" – 5:53
"Leave My Soul Alone" (music by Michael Denner) – 3:21
"M.D.A." (Mission: Destroy Aliens) (music and lyrics by Denner) – 4:20
"You Asked for It" – 4:13

Credits
King Diamond - Vocals
Hank Shermann - Guitar, bass on 9
Benny Petersen - Guitar (tracks 1-6)
Michael Denner - Guitar (tracks 7, 8)
Timi Hansen - Bass (except 9)
Kim Ruzz - Drums on 1 - 6
Carsten Volsing - Guitar on 9
Old Nick Smith - drums on 7, 8
Jan Musen - drums on 9
Tracks 1-5: recorded in Copenhagen, Denmark, late autumn 1981, Kharma Studio. 
Track 6: recorded in Hull, England, early spring 1982. 
Tracks 7-8: Recorded in Copenhagen, Denmark, summer 1981 at Brenner Studio. 
Track 9: Recorded in Copenhagen, Denmark, early spring 1981.
 "On a Night of Full Moon" was the original demo of "Desecration of Souls" from the Don't Break the Oath album.
 "Death Kiss" was the original demo of "A Dangerous Meeting" from the Don't Break the Oath album
 "Leave My Soul Alone" and "M.D.A." were originally songs from Michael Denner's band.
 "You Asked for It" was the original demo of "Black Masses"; the B-side of the "Black Funeral" single.

References

Mercyful Fate albums
1992 compilation albums
Roadrunner Records compilation albums